Douglas (Doug) L. Dorset (August 29, 1942 – December 8, 2016) was an American crystallographer who, along with Jerome Karle, pioneered the field of electron crystallography.

Dorset studied chemistry at Juniata College in Pennsylvania, and obtained his Ph.D. at University of Maryland, Baltimore in biophysics under Albert Hybl in 1973. He worked at Roswell Park Cancer Institute and at Hauptman-Woodward Medical Research Institute. In 2000, he moved to ExxonMobil, where he investigated the structure of wax crystals and how these change in the presence of modifiers.

Dorset received the A. L. Patterson Award from the American Crystallographic Association in 2002.

Bibliography

See also
 Jerome Karle
 Electron crystallography

References

1942 births
2016 deaths
American crystallographers
Juniata College alumni
University of Maryland, Baltimore alumni
ExxonMobil people
American chemists
American biophysicists